In the mathematical field of numerical ordinary differential equations, a geometric integrator is a numerical method that preserves geometric properties of the exact flow of a differential equation.

Pendulum example
We can motivate the study of geometric integrators by considering the motion of a pendulum.

Assume that we have a pendulum whose bob has mass  and
whose rod is massless of length . Take the
acceleration due to gravity to be . Denote by
 the angular displacement of the rod from the vertical,
and by  the pendulum's momentum. The Hamiltonian of
the system, the sum of its kinetic and potential energies, is

which gives Hamilton's equations

It is natural to take the configuration space  of all  to be the unit
circle , so that  lies on the
cylinder . However, we will take
, simply because -space is
then easier to plot. Define 
Let us experiment by
using some simple numerical methods to integrate this system. As usual,
we select a constant step size, and for an arbitrary non-negative integer  we write
.
We use the following methods.

  (explicit Euler),

  (implicit Euler),

  (symplectic Euler),

  (implicit midpoint rule).

The observation that  is constant along the solution
curves of the Hamilton's equations allows us to describe the exact
trajectories and the numerical solutions of the system. For the explicit
and implicit Euler methods we take , and z0 = (0.5, 0) and (1.5, 0) respectively; for the other two methods we take , and z0 = (0, 0.7), (0, 1.4) and (0, 2.1).

The explicit (resp. implicit) Euler method spirals out from (resp. in to) the origin. The other two methods show the correct qualitative behaviour, with the implicit midpoint rule agreeing with the exact solution to a greater degree than the symplectic Euler method.

Recall that the exact flow  of a Hamiltonian system with one degree of freedom is
area-preserving, in the sense that
 for all .
This formula is easily verified by hand. For our pendulum
example we see that the numerical flow  of the explicit Euler method is not area-preserving; viz.,

A similar calculation can be carried out for the implicit Euler method,
where the determinant is

However, the symplectic Euler method is area-preserving:

thus . The implicit midpoint rule has similar geometric properties.

To summarize: the pendulum example shows that, besides the explicit and
implicit Euler methods not being good choices of method to solve the
problem, the symplectic Euler method and implicit midpoint rule agree
well with the exact flow of the system, with the midpoint rule agreeing
more closely. Furthermore, these latter two methods are area-preserving,
just as the exact flow is; they are two examples of geometric (in fact, symplectic) integrators.

Moving frame method
The moving frame method can be used to construct numerical methods which preserve Lie symmetries of the ODE. Existing methods such as Runge-Kutta can be modified using moving frame method to produce invariant versions.

See also
 Energy drift
 Mimesis (mathematics)

References

Further reading
  
 
  
 

Numerical differential equations